The following is a complete discography of all albums and singles credited to American musician Hank Williams III, some of which were released without his approval.

Studio albums

Collaboration albums and side projects

Unsanctioned albums

After Williams left the label, Curb Records decided to release old materials but advertising those albums as new releases. Williams, who never authorized these albums, rejected their validity.

Hillbilly Joker 
Released May 17, 2011 on the sublabel Sidewalk Records.

Basically it's the album This Ain't Country, recorded in 2001 but rejected by the label. Two missing tracks ("Hang On" and "Runnin' and Gunnin'") were not included here but on the third collection.

Long Gone Daddy 
Released April 17, 2012 on Curb Records.
{| class="wikitable"
|+
!Title
!Original source
|-
|"I'm a Long Gone Daddy"
|Timeless: Hank Williams Tribute
|-
|"Sun Comes Up"
|Lovesick, Broke and Driftin' outtake
|-
|"The Bottle Let Me Down"
|(Unknown, Merle Haggard cover)
|-
|"Wreck of the Old '97"
|Dressed in Black: A Tribute to Johnny Cash
|-
|"'Neath a Cold Gray Tomb of Stone"
|Three Hanks: Men with Broken Hearts
|-
|"The Wind Blew Cold"
|(Unknown)
|-
|"Good Hearted Woman"
|(Unknown, Waylon Jennings cover)
|-
|"This Ain't Montgomery" (with Joey Allcorn)
|Actually by Allcorn with Hank III as guest; from 50 Years Too Late
|-
|"What They Want Me to Be"
|"Trashville" (from Lovesick, Broke and Driftin'''), but remixed with little overdubbings
|-
|"If the Shoe Fits (Shuffle Mix)"
|Slightly alternate version, originally from Risin' Outlaw|}

 Ramblin' Man 
Released April 1, 2014 on Curb Records.

 Take as Needed for Pain 
Released April 14, 2015 on Curb Records.

 Greatest Hits 
Released August 18, 2017 on Curb Records.

A selection of tracks from the country albums done on the label (mainly from Straight to Hell'').

Official bootlegs
Hank III started sharing bootlegs of his own live shows, specially of his heavier stuff, and (on the last one) demos of the then-unreleased AssJack album.

Singles

Notable appearances

Music videos

References

Country music discographies
Discographies of American artists